Delhi Giants (formerly Delhi Jets until the 2008 Edelweiss 20's Challenge) was one of the nine teams played in the now-defunct Indian Cricket League (ICL). This team represented the Indian capital city, New Delhi, and its captain was Marvan Atapattu, former skipper of Sri Lanka.

Players 

The squad announced for the inaugural tournament comprises five international cricketers. Delhi Giants had a well-balanced team with international-level players such as Atapattu as captain and experienced players like Paul Nixon and Taufeeq Umar; and local talent from various parts of India.

Former team 
Coach - Madan Lal
 Marvan Atapattu (Sri Lanka)
 Mohnish Mishra (Bhopal, Madhya Pradesh)
 Taufeeq Umar (Pakistan)
 Abbas Ali (Madhya Pradesh)
 Paul Nixon (England)
 Dale Benkenstein (South Africa)
 Jai Prakash Yadav (Railways)
 Ali Murtaza (Uttar Pradesh)
 TP Sudhindra (Madhya Pradesh)
  Anand Pratap Singh (Madhya Pradesh)
 Abid Nabi (Jammu and Kashmir)
 Sachin Dholpure (Madhya Pradesh)
 Abhishek Tamrakar (Madhya Pradesh)
 Shalabh Srivastava (Uttar Pradesh)
 Abhishek Sharma (Delhi)
 Dishant Yagnik (Udaipur)
 Dhruv Mahajan (Jammu and Kashmir)
 Abhinav Bali
 Raghav Sachdev
 Shane Bond (New Zealand)

Coach 
The coach for this Delhi Giants team is former Indian international Madan Lal.

Previous performance

References 

Indian Cricket League teams
Cricket clubs established in 2007
Cricket in Delhi
Former senior cricket clubs of India
2007 establishments in Delhi